The Dark Path is the second novel in the series by Walter H. Hunt. Sequel to The Dark Wing, it is set 70 years later. Few characters make a reappearance. Marais is dead and most of the characters are new. Humans and Zor are at peace due to Admiral Marias' and Captain Sergei's actions in The Dark Wing, with Sergei having taken on the mantle of gyaryu'har. The gyaryu falls into the hands of a new race with telepathic powers, whose name is shortened to the 'vuhl' for convenience, in a move that we later find out to have great meaning and import for the main character of The Dark Path, The Dark Ascent, and The Dark Crusade, Jackie Lapperiere. The commander of one of the first territories to be attacked by the vuhl, she evacuates, thus saves everyone but Sergei, eventually becoming the new gyaryu'har.

External links 
 

2003 novels
2003 science fiction novels